The Tumbesian tyrannulet or Tumbes tyrannulet (Nesotriccus tumbezanus) is a species of bird in the tyrant flycatcher family Tyrannidae. It occurs in desert scrub and wooded habitats in southwest Ecuador and northwest Peru. Within its restricted range it is fairly common, but its small size and dull plumage results in it often being overlooked – or at least not identified, as it resembles several other tyrant flycatchers. The common name is from the city of Tumbes in northwest Peru. 

Two subspecies are recognised:
 Nesotriccus tumbezanus tumbezanus (Taczanowski, 1877) – southwest Ecuador and extreme northwest Peru
 Nesotriccus tumbezanus inflavus Chapman, 1924 – northwest Peru

The Tumbesian tyrannulet was formerly considered conspecific with the widespread southern mouse-colored tyrannulet. The two species are visually very similar, but vocally distinct.

References

External links
Xeno-canto: audio recordings of the Tumbesian Tyrannulet

Nesotriccus
Birds of Ecuador
Birds of Peru
Birds of the Tumbes-Chocó-Magdalena
Birds described in 1877